Meakin is a surname. Notable people with the surname include:

Alf Meakin (born 1938), retired track and field athlete
Breanne Meakin (in marriage Breanne Knapp) (born 1990), Canadian female curler
Douglas Meakin (1929–1998), English cricketer
Harry Meakin (1919–1986), footballer who played in The Football League for Stoke City
Lewis Henry Meakin (1850–1917), American Impressionist landscape artist born in Newcastle, England, moving to Cincinnati, Ohio in 1863
Peter Meakin, Australian journalist and the head of news and current affairs at the Seven Network
Rob Meakin (born 1964), Canadian curler and coach

See also
J. & G. Meakin, English pottery manufacturing company founded in 1851 and based in Hanley, Stoke-on-Trent, Staffordshire
Mohan Meakin Brewery, large group of companies started with Asia's first brewery incorporated in 1855
Janet Meakin Poor (born 1929), landscape design specialist based out of Winnetka, Illinois